The FCA Winners' Championship was a Greek football league competition contested annually by the most recent winners of all local Football Clubs' Associations championships in Greece. It is not considered part of the Greek football league system, due to a lack of formal structure, requiring all local FCA championships to have been completed prior to its start. The FCA Winners' Championship was ←founded in 1960, and held annually until 1962, as an experimental format for a 2nd tier in the Greek football league system. The competition was once again established and held annually during 1968−1977 going by the name "Amateur Championship" as a means of achieving promotion to the formally-structured Beta Ethniki (the official 2nd tier of the Greek football league system, renamed in 2010 to Football League).

As of 1987, the FCA Winners' Championship role was diminished to determining promotion to the Delta Ethniki (the fourth tier of the Greek football league system) by the local FCA champions. In fact, during the 2002−03 season, due to a re-structuring of the Greek football league system, the FCA Winners' Championship was contested by Delta Ethniki Group winners, as a means of determining which clubs would eventually earn promotion to the Gamma Ethniki (thus effectively cutting down the number of promoting teams from 10 to 5, winners being determined in single knockout matches held at neutral grounds). The 19th edition of the competition took place during the 2011−12 post-season period.

On July 25, 2012 the Hellenic Football Federation decided to effectively neglect the outcome of the 2012 edition of the competition, thus allowing all local FCA champions to promote to the Delta Ethniki. The competition was not abolished however, and after merging the Delta and Gamma Ethniki into an amateur third level football league comprising six (and later four) Groups, the FCA Winners' Championship was re-purposed to determine promotion from local competitions to the national level. In the 22nd edition of the competition (2015), the 14 Group winners earned promotion to the Gamma Ethniki, while the 2016 edition allowed twice as much clubs (28 in total, including Group runners-up) to advance to the Gamma Ethniki.

1960–1962 winners
After the conclusion of all local FCA championships, each tournament edition involved three, four and ten Groups respectively, and contested by the local champions for earning promotion to the Alpha Ethniki, the highest professional football league in Greece.

1968–1977 winners
The winners of the single knockout matches that were held as part of the "Amateur Championship" between local FCA champions in the years spanning between the 1967–68 and 1976–77 seasons were promoted to the Beta Ethniki.

1987–2001 winners
As of the 1986–87 and until the 2000–01 season the winners of the single knockout matches, contested by local FCA champions, were promoted to the Delta Ethniki. Due to the fact that the latter was organized into 4 Groups during these years, it was impossible for all FCA Winners' Champions to earn promotion to the Delta Ethniki.

2012–2016 winners
In 2012, the Hellenic Football Federation re-instated the FCA Winners' Championship in order for local champions to earn promotion to the recently re-formatted Gamma Ethniki. The Table below presents all FCA Winners' Championship winners, as well as clubs also earning promotion to the Gamma Ethniki as runners-up (where indicated).

See also 
 Greek football league system
Football records and statistics in Greece

References

Sources
"ΑΘΛΗΤΙΚΗ ΗΧΩ"-29ης Ιουνίου 1987 (Greek)
"ΑΘΛΗΤΙΚΗ ΗΧΩ"-6ης Ιουνίου 1988 (Greek)
"ΑΘΛΗΤΙΚΗ ΗΧΩ"-3ης Ιουνίου 1999 (Greek)
"ΑΘΛΗΤΙΚΗ ΗΧΩ"-5ης Ιουνίου 2000 (Greek)
"ΑΘΛΗΤΙΚΗ ΗΧΩ"-5ης Ιουνίου 2001 (Greek)
"ΑΘΛΗΤΙΚΗ ΗΧΩ"-22ας Ιουνίου 2003 (Greek)

External links
 Υπό κατάργηση η Δ΄Εθνική (Greek)
 Το σχέδιο για την άνοδο στη Δ΄Εθνική 2012-13 (Greek)

 
 
 
Football leagues in Greece